The Futurebirds are an American Rock And Roll band formed in 2008, in Athens, Georgia.

They are known for their high energy live productions that create a unique and complex Rock And Roll concert experience. Their most recent cut was notably captured live in Spring of 2022 at Ronnie’s Place in Nashville, Tennessee. The seven-song Bloomin’ Too  with Carl Broemel was described as a vortex of sonic textures. The album ricocheted from cosmic space, rock to rough around the edges, alt-country dreamscapes, and sandy beach odes to kick in your step pop ballads — all signature tones and musical avenues at the core of the Birds' that have an even wider, indescribable musical palette.

Rolling Stone's author, Garret Woodward, says that the Futurebirds "selections are undeniably catchy and poignant, each varying greatly from one tune to the next, something immediately comparable to the melodic swagger and genius of The Band." 

The camaraderie between founding members Carter King, Daniel Womack, Thomas Johnson, and Brannen Miles has been ironclad since they were college students at the University of Georgia. The quartet has added Kiffy Myers, Spencer Thomas, and Tom Myers.

The Futurebirds are highly revered by the most renown professional musicians in the United States Of America.

My Morning Jacket guitarist/producer Carl Broemel and the Futurebirds joined together to create a bountiful partnership that initially came to fruition with the 2021 EP, Bloomin’. 

Carl Broemel found a sincere kinship and solidarity with the Futurebirds. Witnessing first-hand the band’s blue-collar work ethic in the studio; Broemel was impressed and inspired by the Futurebirds democratic ways and means in how music is created and cultivated in the studio. “The Futurebirds have this unique vibe with three singer-songwriters in the band, where everyone is constantly shifting their function depending on the song,” Broemel says. “Everyone just kind of falls into place and finds something to contribute. Someone will lead the charge on one song, then fall back and let another take charge on the next — it’s something rare to see and behold in rock music, where normally there’s just one songwriter and one leader.”

Discography

Studio albums 
 Hampton's Lullaby (2010), Autumn Tone
 Baba Yaga (2013), Fat Possum
 Hotel Parties (2015), Easy Sound
 Teamwork (2020), VL4L Records

Live albums 
 Seney-Stovall (2012)

EPs 
 Futurebirds (2009), Self released - reissued (2011), Autumn Tone
 Via Flamina (2011), Autumn Tone
 Baba Java (2014), VL4L Records
 Portico I (2016), Easy Sound 
 Portico II (2017), Easy Sound  Re-released as Portico, a full-length compilation with Portico I in 2018 on VL/4L Records.
Bloomin' (2021), featuring Carl Broemel of My Morning Jacket
Bloomin' Too (2022), featuring Carl Broemel of My Morning Jacket
Ghoulin' Around (Available only Oct 19th - Oct 31st 2022) Halloween Bandcamp-only release, with plans of re-release next halloween

Split/Single 
 'Painted Tears' (2015), A-side split single. B-side 'Too Little, Too Late' by T. Hardy Morris. Record Store Day release

References

External links 

 autumntone.com
 https://www.rollingstone.com/music/music-country/futurebirds-new-album-tour-dates-943182/

Indie rock musical groups from Georgia (U.S. state)
Musical groups from Athens, Georgia
Fat Possum Records artists